The 2016 Selangor FA Season is Selangor FA's 11th season playing soccer in the Malaysia Super League since its inception in 2004.

Selangor FA began the season on 7 February 2016. They will also compete in three domestic cups: the FA Cup Malaysia, Malaysia Cup; the Malaysia Charity Shield; and an international cup, the AFC Cup.

Season overview

Pre-season
(Squad build and first transfers)

On 18 December 2015, Selangor made announcement with signing of four new local players from Pahang, Hafiz Kamal, R. Gopinathan, Khairul Azhan and Razman Roslan. Selangor also bring in a new goalkeeper from AirAsia, Zarif Irfan Hashimuddin.

On 31 December 2015, Selangor announced that Mehmet Durakovic would step down at the end of the season after successfully led the Red Giants to win the Malaysia Cup last season. He was then replaced by Zainal Abidin Hassan from Pahang on 1 January 2016.

New coach Selangor, Zainal Abidin then bring in new foreign players from Argentina and Liberia, Mauro Olivi and Patrick Wleh, to replace Brazilian duo Guilherme de Paula and Leandro Dos Santos, after both their contracts were not renewed by the club. Selangor signs Patrick Wleh from PKNS on loan, while Mauro Olivi brought in as a free agent after the expiration of the contract with the football club Peru, León de Huánuco.

The contracts of import Indonesian player Andik Vermansyah were renewed for another two years and are set to expire at the end of 2017. Robert Cornthwaite extended his contract until the end of 2016.

On 18 December 2015, The Red Giants release some of the players who will move to another team to face the new challenges of the 2016 season. On that day, Hamsani Ahmad retired from professional football. On the same day after the announcement of the Selangor's new coach, Afiq Azmi, Shazlan Alias and Syamim Othman left to join Malaysian Premier League club (second division), Negeri Sembilan. K. Gurusamy and K. Thanaraj confirmed that they was set to join Sarawak, while Thamil Arasu decides to join Kuala Lumpur for next season.

Before the first transfer window closed, Selangor quickly signs Adam Nor Azlin from Malaysia youth's team, Harimau Muda A.

Mid-season

(Second transfers)

On 5 July 2016, Selangor and Australian centre-back Robert Cornthwaite reached an agreement to terminate his contract after a year and half with the team. Selangor had to release Cornthwaite for reasons his poor form and constant injuries throughout the first half of the Malaysia Super League (MSL) campaign. He then signed with Australian club Western Sydney Wanderers.

On 9 July, Selangor announced the signing of the new import player from Nigeria Ugo Ukah. Ukah will replace the position left by Cornthwaite and signed a contract until the end of 2016.

Before the second transfer window closed, Selangor and the Super League club champions, Johor Darul Ta'zim have reached an agreement for the transfer of defender Azrif Nasrulhaq for a reported fee of £130,450. Azrif made the shock decision to join JDT though his contract with the Red Giants still remaining one and a half years and will expire at the end of 2017.

Pre-season and friendly matches

On 19 January 2016, Selangor kicked off the preseason with a 2–0 victory over Sarawak. Goals from Patrick Wleh and Hafiz Kamal secured the win  at their interim home in Selayang. On 26 January, Selangor continued their winning streak at home after successfully beating Kuala Lumpur 2–1, thanks to goals from new foreign players, Patrick Wleh and Mauro Olivi. Two days later, the team travelled north to George Town, Penang, to play against Penang FA at Penang City Stadium. Selangor lost the match 1–0 with a goal from local player Jafri Firdaus, at 83th-minute.

Selangor then flew to Thailand for a match against two club Thailand from Thai Division 1 League, Nakhon Pathom and Samut Songkhram R-Airlines. On 31 January, in the first tour match, Selangor been defeated by Nakhon Pathom 2–0. Next day, Selangor once again failed to win in a friendly match tour when they lost 4–2 to Samut Songkhram. As a whole, Selangor ended the pre-season and friendly matches with 2 wins and 3 defeats.

February

As Malaysia Cup champions, Selangor began the season against the holders of the Super League, Johor Darul Ta'zim in the 2016 Charity Shield. That match was also the first game in the league for both teams. The match was played at Tan Sri Dato Haji Hassan Yunos Stadium, in Larkin, Johor on 13 February 2016. The game finished 1–1 after 90 minutes, Selangor lost the match with 7–6 penalty shoot-out.

Despite losing in the Charity Shield match, Selangor managed to bring back 1 point for league games. JDT opened the scoring with a goals from Hariss Harun, before Selangor equalized with a free kick from Hafiz Kamal.

On 16 February, Selangor won 1–0 at Perak by goal from Patrick Wleh. Three days later, Selangor faced AirAsia in the FA Cup match, came away with a 2–0 victory, thanks to goals from Patrick Wleh and Hadi Yahya. The victory brought Red Giants qualified to the third round.

On 23 February, Selangor started the 2016 AFC Cup season with visited the Philippines club, Ceres FC. The game ended eventually in a 2–2 draw. Stephan Schröck opened the scoring for Ceres at 18th minute, before Mauro Olivi equalized before half-time. Hafiz Kamal give an advantage to the visitors by scoring the second goal from a free kick, however, the home team finally managed to equalize 2–2 with goals from Adrián Gallardo Valdés at 87th minute.

Back to the league campaign, Selangor then beat Pahang 1–3 away through goal from Winger R. Gopinathan and a brace from Patrick Wleh.

March

On 1 March, Selangor opened the new month with a 4–2 victory against Sarawak at home with goals from Gopinathan, Azrif and a brace from Patrick Wleh. With their first win at home, this was the team's third-consecutive win in the league and they've been on top of the table after four matches.

Three days later, despite goal from Patrick Wleh, Selangor fell to PDRM 2–1 in the FA Cup third round, causing the Red Giants were eliminated again in this competition.

On 8 March, in its second match in the AFC Cup, Selangor lost 0–1 at home to Tampines Rovers; the only goal scored from the away team came from Fazrul Nawaz.

Three days later in Kuala Terengganu in Terengganu, The Red Giants were soundly defeated 3–1 by Terengganu to suffer their first league defeat and drop out of first place in the table. The loss also meant that Selangor suffered with the third-straight defeat after three games (FA Cup, AFC Cup and Super League).

On 15 March, Selangor flew to the Bangabandhu National Stadium to play the third match of the AFC Cup group stage against Sheikh Jamal Dhanmondi. Selangor won the match 4–3 as Olivi scored double and Gopinathan and Patrick Wleh each scored once. This was the Red Giant's first victory in an international club competition after two matches.

April

On 5 April after international break, Selangor played against Kedah at home. The teams drew 2–2, with goals from Gopinathan and Patrick Wleh.

On 8 April, Selangor lost to FELDA United away at the Tun Abdul Razak Stadium by a score of 3–1. The lone Selangor goal was scored by Patrick Wleh.

Four days later, Selangor continued secure a win in the AFC Cup match, defeated Sheikh Jamal Dhamondi 2–1 at home, in their fourth group match; with a goals from Hazwan Bakri and a late goal from Patrick Wleh.

On 20 April, Selangor defeated Penang 1–0 at home with the only goal came from Mauro Olivi. Three days later, Selangor drop their points again after a goalless draw with PDRM at Hang Jebat Stadium. On the league table, that result saw Selangor fell to fourth placed again.

On 26 April, Selangor failed to seize the opportunity to clinch a spot in knockout rounds of the AFC Cup, after the match against Ceres FC ended with a goalless draw at home.

May

On 4 May, Selangor faced T–Team with comeback to original home, Shah Alam Stadium. The Red Giants defeated the visitors 2–1 with a goals from Olivi and a late goal from Adam Nor Azlin to reach the next victory in league.

On 10 May, Selangor loss 1–0 against Tampines Rovers in the last match of group stage at National Stadium, Singapore. The loss meant that Selangor failed to progress past the group stage of the AFC Cup for the second time in 3 years after last time qualified for the knockout rounds in 2013.

Back into the league campaign, Selangor once again ended with a goalless draw, this time against Kelantan at home. That match was the last match of the first round in the league, with Selangor recording the record of 5 wins, 4 draws and 2 defeats.

On 21 May, Selangor started the second round of the league, faced Kelantan again, as a visitor. Selangor went on to win the match 5–2, with a five lone goals from Hafiz Kamal, Gopinathan, Nazmi Faiz, Razman Roslan and Hazwan Bakri. The victory was the first biggest away win for Selangor, and also the team's last game in this month, before the league will take a long break to celebrate Ramadan.

On 23 May, as defending champions, Selangor were drawn into Group B of the Malaysia Cup alongside Kelantan, Pahang, and Kuala Lumpur.

July

On 12 July after a long break for a month, Selangor start the Malaysia Cup campaign as the defending champions, with the first match against Kuala Lumpur in the group stage. The supersub Adam Nor Azlin came to Selangor's rescue with a late goal at 88th minute as they won the first Klang Valley Derby in four years, to give the defending Malaysia Cup champions a winning start.

In Super League on 16 July, Selangor won the match after defeating PDRM at home 2–1. PDRM advance ahead through a goal from de Paula, followed by equalizer from Hazwan Bakri after the break, before late goals from Ugo Ukah brought victory for Selangor to strengthen position league in the third place.

In its second match in the Malaysia Cup, Selangor tied with Kelantan 3–3 at home, with Selangor's goals scored by Mauro Olivi and Patrick Wleh's brace, and Kelantan's goals scored by Wander Luiz, Wan Zack Haikal, with substitute Abdul Manaf Mamat scoring the late equaliser for the visitor.

In the fourteen round of league, on 23 July, Selangor meet Penang at away. Penang's import player from Korea Jeong Seok-Min put his team in the lead, but Patrick Wleh levelled for Red Giants, with the match finishing in a 1–1 draw.

Three days later, Selangor hosted FELDA United at Shah Alam Stadium. The visitors took the lead in the 3rd minute through Francis Forkey Doe, but Selangor equalized with Patrick Wleh goal at the 63rd minute. However, FELDA United hit back immediately, with Forkey Doe scores again to grabbing the winner for visitors, as Zainal Abidin' side slipped to their first home defeat in the league.

At the end of the month, Selangor played its third match in the Malaysia Cup group stage, against Pahang at the Darul Makmur Stadium. Selangor's losing streak continued as they experienced their first defeat in this competition; a single goal from Matthew Davies decided the outcome of the match. With the loss, Selangor stay in the second position of the group stage behind Kelantan with 3 points difference.

August

On 3 August, Selangor suffered its second loss in the league at the hands of T–Team, with a goal by Makan Konate deciding the match.

Three days later, Selangor once again failed to reach the victory after losing 1–0 to Kedah in the 17th league match at Darul Aman Stadium. The only goal scored from the home team came from Bang Seung-Hwan. With the loss, this is the team's third defeat in the league and gather fourth straight defeat overall, including a 1–0 loss to Pahang in the Malaysia Cup, 30 July.

The next day, Selangor officially made the decision to terminate the contract coach Zainal Abidin Hassan, following the team's dismal performance fallen four times in a row in the last four games. Assistant coach K. Gunalan will serve as interim coach until Selangor find a permanent replacement.

On 9 August after the dismissal of Zainal Abidin, The Red Giants continued their Malaysia Cup campaign in the fourth match of the group stage, and finally clinched victory after beating Pahang 3–0 at home. Patrick Wleh scored a hat-trick to ensure the victory for the Red Giants, and become the first player to score a hat-trick for the team this season.

In the fifth match of the Malaysia Cup group stage, played on 12 August, Selangor defeated Kelantan 4–1 at the Sultan Muhammad IV Stadium. The goal given by Wan Zaharulnizam for Kelantan did not last long, as goals from Hadi Yahya, Patrick Wleh and a brace from Gopinathan gave Selangor win. The victory sealed their place in the quarter-finals.

On 16 August, back to the Super League campaign, Selangor could only draw 1–1 with Terengganu at home, with goals by Ashaari Shamsuddin (64th minute) for Terengganu and Andik Vermansyah (84th minute) for Selangor. The failure of the team to achieve a win in five league games, saw them now down to fourth in the league table.

On 20 August, Selangor played last match of the 2016 Malaysia Cup group stage, against Kuala Lumpur at Selayang Stadium (away). The Red Giants managed to get a 1–1 draw with the goal being scored by Hazwan Bakri, ensuring their in the top spot of Group B.

On 23 August, Selangor visited Sarawak in the matchday 19 of the league. After the scoring from Sarawak foreign players Juninho, a goal from Adam Nor Azlin was not enough to bring the victory against the home team. The match finishing in a 1–1 draw.

On 28 August, Selangor defeated PKNS at the Shah Alam Stadium with a 3–4 win in their Malaysia Cup first leg encounter to move closer to qualifying for the semi-finals. Ugo Ukah, Hazwan Bakri, Gopinathan and Olivi scored for Selangor.

September

On 10 September, Selangor suffered again with a 0–1 loss against Pahang at home,  almost damaged the hopes for Red Giants to climb up the third place in the league. Pablo Vranjicán provided the goals for visitors to win the match. This is the second defeat at home to Selangor, where they still failed to win after six games in league matches.

On 18 September, Selangor advanced to the Malaysia Cup semi-finals with a 1–0 victory (5–3 on aggregate) over PKNS. The goal were scored by Nazmi Faiz Mansor, and they get closer to retaining the trophy they won last year.

On 24 September, Selangor were down into fifth place Super League after losing 1–0 to Perak, and again lost at home for the third time. Visitors gained the winning goal through's own goal from Ugo Ukah in the 48th minute. With only one more league matches, Selangor could not afford to bypass the third-placed team, Kedah, and had to be content to be under the top three.

October

On 1 October, Selangor played the first leg of the semi-finals of the Malaysia Cup against T–Team, winning 2–1 at home. Ugo Ukah's late winner helped settle the tie after Patrick Cruz (T–Team) and Hazwan Bakri have both scored in the first half.

On 15 October, Selangor made it to the Malaysia Cup final for the second time after beating T–Team 3–0, in the second leg of the semi-final at Sultan Ismail Nasiruddin Shah Stadium, Kuala Terengganu. Goals from Gopinathan, Ugo Ukah and Andik Vermansyah was enough to take the team to the finals, beating opponents with a 5–1 aggregate. Selangor once again will face Kedah in the final for the second time after both teams met in last season's final, which Selangor won 2–0.

On 22 October, Selangor played their last league game of the season at home with lost 1–2 against Johor Darul Ta'zim. After the visitors took the early lead with goal from Jorge Pereyra Díaz, Hazwan Bakri scored the equalizer before former Selangor player Amri Yahyah scored the decisive goal 12 minutes before the end of the match. With the defeat, Selangor finished fifth with 28 points and also collecting a record 7 wins, 7 draws and 8 defeats.

On 30 October 2016, Selangor played the 2016 Malaysia Cup Final against Kedah. Selangor failed to defend the title after the match ended with 1–1 after extra time, but Kedah won a 6–5 on penalties. Selangor goal scored by Hazwan Bakri, while Kedah's goals were scored by Rizal Ghazali. That match was the last match for both teams to close the curtains Malaysia League 2016.

Kit
Supplier: Lotto / Sponsor: Selangor

Players

First Team squad

† Player left the club during the season

Reserve Team squad (call-up)

" Share jersey numbers

Transfers

First transfers
23 November 2015 – 14 February 2016

Transfers in

Transfers out

Second transfer
20 Jun – 15 July 2016

Transfers in

Transfers out

Pre-season and friendlies

Selangor FA friendlies

Friendly Match 1

Friendly Match 2

Friendly Match 3

Friendly Match 4

Friendly Match 5

Competitions

Overall

Overview

Malaysia Super League

Table

Results summary

Results by round

Charity Shield

'

Selangor FA Results
Fixtures and Results of the Malaysia Super League 2016 season.

Malaysia Super League

'

Results overview

FA Cup

AFC Cup

Group stage

Malaysia Cup
Selangor joined the competition in the group stage.

Group stage

Knockout phase

Quarter-finals

Semi-finals

Final

Statistics

Squad statistics
 

Appearances (Apps.) numbers are for appearances in competitive games only including sub appearances.\
Red card numbers denote: Numbers in parentheses represent red cards overturned for wrongful dismissal.

" Share jersey numbers 
† Player left the club during the season

Goalscorers
Includes all competitive matches.

† Player left the club during the season

Top assists

† Player left the club during the season

Clean sheets

Disciplinary record

† Player left the club during the season

References

Malaysian football clubs 2016 season
Selangor FA